Kos International Airport (also known as Hippocrates)  is an international airport on the island of Kos in Greece. It is located near Andimachia Village, and is operated by Fraport AG, all operations within the airport are handled by Swissport.

The airport mainly serves charter airlines, who bring customers on holiday to the island. Kos Airport hits its peak in summer, with flights from German and British airlines primarily.

History 
The airport was opened on 4 April 1964. In 1974, the runway was extended to 2,400 metres. Due to increased traffic at the airport, a new terminal was built in 1980. In 1997, the terminal building was renovated and expanded.

In December 2015, the privatisation of Kos Island International Airport and 13 other regional airports of Greece was finalised with the signing of the agreement between the Fraport AG/Copelouzos Group joint venture and the state privatisation fund. "We signed the deal today," the head of Greece's privatisation agency HRADF, Stergios Pitsiorlas, told Reuters. According to the agreement, the joint venture will operate the 14 airports (including Kos Island International Airport) for 40 years as of 11 April 2017.

On 22 March 2017, Fraport AG and its Greek subsidiary Fraport Greece presented its plans for 14 regional airports that they had been handed control of by the Greek Government. The immediate actions by Fraport were to improve lighting, improve the marking of airside areas, upgrade sanitary facilities, enhance WiFi services and implementing better fire safety throughout the airport.

The long-term plans by the operator, which are due to continue until 2021, are to build a new terminal and a new fire station, refurbish the waste water treatment plant, and add more security check lanes and check in counters.

Airlines and destinations
The following airlines operate regular scheduled and charter flights at Kos Airport:

Statistics 

The data are from Hellenic Civil Aviation Authority (CAA) until 2016 and from 2017 onwards from the official website of the airport.

Traffic statistics by country (2022)

Ground transport
By public bus: A transit bus service operates between the airport and Kos town, Mastichari, Kardamena and Kefalos.

By tour operator transfer: Tour operators such as Jet2holidays and TUI UK provide free bus transfers from customers' accommodation to the airport.

By taxi: 24/7 metered taxi service is available outside the Kos Airport Terminal building.

By car: Kos Airport is located 24 km from the Kos town and is accessible from the provincial road Kos-Kefalos.

Accidents and incidents
In 2013, an Air Explore Boeing 737 made an emergency landing due to the left engine overheating. Once it taxied to the gate, the engine caught fire. The pilot ordered an evacuation using the emergency slides on either side of the aircraft. No one was injured during the incident.

See also
Transport in Greece

References

External links 
Kos Airport stats

Airports in Greece
Kos
Buildings and structures in the South Aegean